Paraphidippus basalis is a species of jumping spider in the family Salticidae. It is found in Arizona and New Mexico, United States, and Sonora, Mexico. Paraphidippus basalis specializes on rosette-forming plants such as agaves, sotols, and yuccas. This specialization on a single group of plants is rare among jumping spiders.

References

Salticidae
Articles created by Qbugbot
Spiders described in 1904
Taxa named by Nathan Banks